The International Campus, Zhejiang University, located in Haining, Zhejiang, China, is a Zhejiang University (ZJU) campus that came into use in 2016 as a base for international cooperation, including two joint institutes with the University of Edinburgh and the University of Illinois at Urbana-Champaign and a joint lab with Imperial College London. It is also home to Zhejiang University International Business School founded on the campus in November 2018. During the COVID-19 pandemic, it also hosts exchange students of several US universities including Cornell University.

History 
The construction of the campus started in 2013 as a collaboration between the university and the Haining government. The first batch of students arrived in 2016. In 2019, its development was included in The Outline of Regional Integration of the Yangtze River Delta Region, thus becoming a national plan. The International Joint Innovation Center was founded on the campus in collaboration with the Ministry of Science and Technology and the Ministry of Education. In 2021, International Campus, ZJU station came into use as the terminal station of the Hangzhou-Haining Intercity Railway.

Architectural design 
With an area of 67 hectares, the campus is located between Lake Juanhu to the south and the Changsha River Wetland Park to the north. 60% of the campus was designed by the Architectural Design and Research Institute of Zhejiang University (UAD), one of the oldest architecture firms in China. Neo-classical styled, the campus buildings have exterior walls made of fair-faced red bricks, which presents slight differences in designs across the three functional zones, including British-styled residential colleges, teaching and service complexes and scientific research buildings. Elements such as red-brick walls, solid and steady stone bases, traditional Chinese sloping roofs are used to mimic the architectural styles of Yuquan Campus buildings built in different historical periods.

Institutions 

 Zhejiang University-University of Edinburgh Institute
 Zhejiang University-University of Illinois at Urbana-Champaign Institute
 Zhejiang University International Business School
 Zhejiang University-Imperial Joint Lab for Applied Data Science

References 

International Campus, Zhejiang University